The red-bellied grackle (Hypopyrrhus pyrohypogaster) is a species of bird in the family Icteridae. Its genus, Hypopyrrhus, is monotypic.

One of the grackles, it is endemic to Colombia where its natural habitat is subtropical or tropical moist montane forests. The species is threatened by habitat destruction and the International Union for Conservation of Nature considers it to be a "vulnerable species".

Description
The sexes are similar in appearance being entirely black apart from a red belly and red under-tail coverts. The bill is conical in shape and the irises are white or yellow. When held in the hand it is possible to see that the feathers of the head, neck and throat have shiny, naked shafts and thick, narrow webs.

Distribution and habitat

Its natural habitat is tropical forest, but the trees are increasingly being felled for timber and to make way for agriculture, and little virgin forest remains within its range. However, it can tolerate some disturbance and can be seen at forest edges, in plantations, on cleared land, in scrub, over pasture and beside roads.

Behaviour
Except during the breeding season, the red-bellied grackle is usually seen in small, noisy groups in the canopy. Sometimes these are mixed flocks with other grackles, and sometimes they may include Oropendolas. The grackles feed on fruit and insects, scrambling about among the branches and foliage, and sometimes clinging upside down. Breeding takes place between March and August. The nest is a cup-shaped structure in the fork of a tree, loosely composed of sticks and dead leaves. The eggs are greenish-grey, blotched and streaked with dark brown and lilac. The giant cowbird (Molothrus oryzivorus) sometimes lays its eggs in the grackle's nest.

Status
H. pyrohypogaster was formerly classified as "endangered" by the International Union for Conservation of Nature but in 2012 the threat level was lowered to "vulnerable". This is on the basis that, although its forest habitat remains under pressure, it has been found at some new locations where it was not known before. The population is believed to be declining due to the continuing decline of the forest cover in the area and the fragmentation of its habitat.

References

red-bellied grackle
Birds of the Colombian Andes
Endemic birds of Colombia
red-bellied grackle
Taxonomy articles created by Polbot